The Richie Rich/Scooby-Doo Show (And Scrappy Too!) is a 60-minute Saturday morning animated package show produced by Hanna-Barbera Productions and broadcast on ABC from November 8, 1980, to November 7, 1981. The program contained segments of Scooby-Doo and Scrappy-Doo and Richie Rich. The Scooby-Doo and Scrappy-Doo shorts represents the sixth show in which Scooby-Doo appears. This was the only Hanna-Barbera package series for which Scooby-Doo was given second billing and also notable for Richie Rich's debut in animation.

Cast 
 Sparky Marcus – Richie Rich
 Don Messick - Scooby-Doo and Scrappy-Doo
 Casey Kasem - Shaggy Rogers
 Christian Hoff – Pee Wee, Freckles
 Dick Beals – Reggie Van Dough
 Bill Callaway – Professor Keanbean
 Nancy Cartwright – Gloria Glad
 Frank Welker – Dollar the Dog, Dr. Blemish, Suavo
 Joan Gerber – Irona the Robot Maid, Mrs. Rich
 Stanley Jones – Mr. Rich, Cadbury the Butler
 Robert Ridgely - Collector

Episodes 
With the exception of the Richie Rich Gems, each episode featured three Scooby-Doo segments and three Richie Rich segments between them. The episodes that contain Scooby-Doo cartoon segments that are repeats from earlier episodes are noted in the following list with “rr” used to indicate where a previously aired cartoon was rerun.

Season 1 (1980–81) 
 "A Close Encounter With A Strange Kind" / "The Robotnappers" / "A Fit Night Out For Bats" / "Piggy Bank Prank" / "The Chinese Food Factory" / "Muscle Beach" (November 8, 1980)
 "Scooby's Desert Dilemma" / "The Rare Scare" / "The Old Cat and Mouse Game" / "Kitty Sitter" / "Stowaways" / "One of Our Aircraft Carriers is Missing" (November 15, 1980)
 "Mummy's the Word" / "Silence is Golden" / "Hang in There, Scooby" / "The Shocking Lady Strikes Again" / "Stuntman Scooby" / "Spring Cleaning" (November 22, 1980)
 "Scooby's Ding-A-Ling Circus" / "The Kangaroo Hop" / "Scooby's Fantastic Island" / "Cur Wash" / "Long John Scrappy" / "The Blur" (November 29, 1980)
 "Scooby's Bull Fright" / "Irona Versus Demona" / "Scooby Ghosts West" / "Chef's Surprise" / "A Bungle in the Jungle" / "The Snow Bounders" (December 6, 1980)
 "Scooby's Fun Zone" / "The Abominable Snow Plan" / "Swamp Witch" / "Miss Robot America" / "Sir Scooby and the Black Knight" / "Constructo" (December 13, 1980)
 "Waxworld" / "The Greatest Invention in the World" / "Scooby in Wonderland" / "Who's Afraid of the Big Bad Bug" / "Scrappy's Birthday" / "Counterfeit Dollar" (December 20, 1980)
 "South Seas Scare" / "Mystery Mountain" / "Scooby's Swiss Miss" / "Poor Little Richbillies" / "Alaskan King Coward" / "Chowhound" (December 27, 1980)
 "Et Tu, Scoob?" / "Wiped Out" / "Soggy Bog Scooby" / "Welcome Uncle Cautious" / "Scooby Gumbo" / "Disaster Master" (January 3, 1981)
 "Way Out Scooby" / "T.V. Dollar" / "Strongman Scooby" / "Disappearing Dignitaries" / "Moonlight Madness" / "The Most Unforgettable Butler" (January 10, 1981)
 "Dog Tag Scooby" / "Prankster Beware" / "Scooby at the Center of the World" / "Clothes Make the Butler" / "Scooby's Trip to Ahz" / "Phantom of the Movies" (January 17, 1981)
 "A Fright At the Opera" / "Cave Boy Richie" / "Robot Ranch" / "Young Irona" / "Surprised Spies" / "The Great Charity Train Robbery" (January 24, 1981)
 "The Invasion of the Scooby Snatchers" / "Baseball Dollar" / "Scooby Dooby Guru" / "The Sinsiter Sports Spectacular" / "Scooby and the Bandit" / "It's No Giggling Matter" (January 31, 1981)

Season 2 (1981) 
 "Scooby Nocchio" / "Space Shark" / "Lighthouse Keeper Scooby" / "The Chef's Watch Dog" / "Scooby's Roots" / "Schoolhouse Romp" (September 19, 1981)
 "Scooby's Escape From Atlantis" / "Richie of the Round Table" / "Excalibur Scooby" / "I Want My Mummy" / "Scooby Saves the World" / "Canine Cadet" (September 26, 1981)
 "Scooby Dooby Goo" / "Voodoo Island" / "Rickshaw Scooby" / "Tooth is Stranger than Fiction" / "Scooby's Luck of the Irish" / "Butlering Made Easy" (October 3, 1981)
 "Backstage Scooby" / "A Special Talent" / "Scooby's House of Mystery" / "Villains Incorporated" / "Sweet Dreams Scooby" / "Bye-Bye Baby" (October 10, 1981)
 "Scooby-Doo 2000" / "Rich Mice" / "Punk Rock Scooby" / "King Bee" / "Canine to Five" / "Chilly Dog" (October 17, 1981)
 "Hardhat Scooby" / "Money Talks" / "Hothouse Scooby" / "Mischief Movie" / "Pigskin Scooby" / "An Ordinary Day" (October 24, 1981)
 "Sopwith Scooby" / "Dog Gone" / "Tenderbigfoot" / "Carnival Man" / "Scooby and the Beanstalk" / "The Day the Estate Stood Still" (October 31, 1981)
 "rr" / "Around the World on Eighty Cents" / "rr" / "No Substitute for a Watch Dog" / "rr" / "Robot Robber" (November 7, 1981)

Home media 
On May 20, 2008, Warner Home Video (via Hanna-Barbera and Warner Bros. Family Entertainment) released The Richie Rich/Scooby-Doo Show: Volume 1 on DVD for the Hanna-Barbera Classics Collection Region 1 for the first time. It features cartoons from the first seven episodes. The segment order is altered from the original air-date order. It is unknown when Warner Home Video will plan to release Volume 2 of the first season and the remainder of the second season of the show on DVD.

References

External links 
 

1980 American television series debuts
1982 American television series endings
1980s American animated television series
American children's animated comedy television series
American children's animated fantasy television series
American children's animated horror television series
American children's animated mystery television series
Animated television series about children
Television shows based on Harvey Comics
Scooby-Doo package shows and programming blocks
American Broadcasting Company original programming
Television series by Hanna-Barbera
Richie Rich (comics)
Television series created by Joe Ruby
Television series created by Ken Spears